The Golden Rooster (Ոսկի աքաղաղ Voski ak’aghagh) is an 1870 Armenian language novel by the novelist Raffi. The novel was adapted into a play by the Hamazgayin Theatre.  Its English translation by Donald Abcarian was published in 2008 by the Taderon Press of the Gomidas Institute in London.

References

1870 novels
Novels by Raffi
Armenian-language novels
Novels set in Armenia